Senator Jarrett may refer to:

Benjamin Jarrett (1881–1944), Pennsylvania State Senate
Fred Jarrett (fl. 2000s–2010s), Washington State Senate
Marilyn Jarrett (1939–2006), Arizona State Senate